"Hands Up" is a song by Italian record producer duo Merk & Kremont, featuring a guest appearance from American band DNCE. It was released through Universal Music Group Italy as a single on 6 April 2018. Production was handled by duo members Merk and Kremont, Eugenio Maimone, and Simon Says, while the vocals are handled by DNCE's lead singer, Joe Jonas. The producers and Jonas wrote the song alongside Josh Record, Ant Whiting, BullySongs, and Emily Phillips.

Background
"Hands Up" is a "funked-up dance track" that sees Joe Jonas singing about "ditching a frustrating relationship" by ghosting the other person in that relationship who caused it to get worse, which causes him to be happy after escaping it and continue living life, especially in the song's chorus: "I throw my hands up / I've already made my mind up / Never get down on my luck / Never get on with my-y-y-y-y-y-y-y / Hands up / I've already made my mind up / Sorry I messed your life up / I'ma get on with mine-ine-ine-ine-ine-ine-ine-ine". A first listen was available on People the day before the release of the song, on 5 April 2018. Merk & Kremont brought out DNCE to perform the song in Milan, Italy, on the day of its release. DNCE announced the song alongside its cover art and release date on 28 March 2018. The official music video for "Hands Up", directed by Andrea Gallo, was released on 10 August 2018. While the people and settings are real, it also includes animations and drawings on real objects.

Track listing
Digital download – Single
"Hands Up" (featuring DNCE) – 2:46 

Digital download – Remixes EP 
"Hands Up" (Neero Remix) (featuring DNCE) – 3:42
"Hands Up" (Brohug Remix) (featuring DNCE) – 3:27
"Hands Up" (Sunstars Remix) (featuring DNCE) – 3:30
"Hands Up" (Denis First & Reznikov Remix) (featuring DNCE) – 3:32
"Hands Up" (Ludwig Remix) (featuring DNCE) – 3:33
"Hands Up" (Raven & Kreyn Remix) (featuring DNCE) – 2:58

Credits and personnel

 Merk & Kremont 
 Merk – production, songwriting
 Kremont – production, songwriting
 DNCE
 Joe Jonas – vocals, songwriting
 Jack Lawless – drums
 JinJoo Lee – guitar
 Cole Whittle – bass
 Eugenio Maimone – production, songwriting
 Simon Says – production, songwriting
 BullySongs – background vocals, songwriting
 Ant Whiting – songwriting
 Emily Phillips – songwriting
 Josh Record – songwriting

Charts

Certifications

References

2018 singles
2018 songs
DNCE songs
Songs written by Joe Jonas
Songs written by Josh Record
Songs written by Ant Whiting
Songs written by Andrew Bullimore